Boz may refer to:

Geography
 Boz, Ain, a French commune
 Boz (Mureș), a river in Hunedoara County, Romania
 Boz (Secaș), a river in Alba County, Romania
 Boz, a village in Doștat Commune, Alba County, Romania
 Boz, a village in Brănișca Commune, Hunedoara County, Romania
 Boʻz, a settlement in Andijan Region, Uzbekistan
 Boʻz District, former name of Boʻston District, Uzbekistan

People and fictional characters
 Boz (name), a list of people and fictional characters with the nickname, given name or surname
 Boz, an early pen name of Charles Dickens
 Boz Burrell (1946–2006), also known as just "Boz", English musician

Other uses
 Bank of Zambia (BoZ), Zambia's national bank
 BoZ, a fictional rock band in Shaman King, a Japanese manga series
 Boz, danewort (Sambucus ebulus), or colorant made from the fruits of that plant
 Boz (album), Boz Scaggs' 1965 debut album
 BOZ counter-measures pod, used on the Panavia Tornado combat aircraft
 .224 Boz, a firearm cartridge
 BOZ, IATA airport code for Bozoum Airport, Bozoum, Central African Republic

See also 

Bergen op Zoom, a city in the Netherlands